The Thief of Damascus (Italian: Il ladro di Damasco) is a 1964 Italian adventure film directed by Mario Amendola and starring Tony Russel, Luciana Gilli and Gianni Solaro. It was released in the US as Sword of Damascus at a running time of 93 minutes.

The film's sets were designed by the art director Alfredo Montori.

Cast
 Tony Russel as Jesen  
 Luciana Gilli as Miriam  
 Gianni Solaro as Tibullo  
 Ferruccio Amendola as Tisba  
 Enrico Salvatore 
 Bruno Ukmar 
 Adriana Limiti 
 Pietro Tordi 
 Irena Prosen 
 Renato Baldini as Uria 
 Giuseppe Fortis as Mannae

References

Bibliography 
 Roy Kinnard & Tony Crnkovich. Italian Sword and Sandal Films, 1908-1990. McFarland, 21 2017.

External links 
 
 The Thief of Damascus at Variety Distribution

1964 films
Italian historical adventure films
1960s Italian-language films
Films directed by Mario Amendola
1960s historical adventure films
Films set in Damascus
Films with screenplays by Mario Amendola
1960s Italian films